Paradise Mountain, or Mount Paradise is a peak of the Kittatinny Mountains in Sussex County, New Jersey, United States. It lies along the Appalachian Trail in the Delaware Water Gap National Recreation Area.

References

External links
National Park Service: Delaware Water Gap National Recreation Area

Mountains of New Jersey
Kittatinny Mountains
Mountains of Sussex County, New Jersey